Sriharikota is a barrier island off the Bay of Bengal coast located in the Shar Project settlement of Tirupati district in Andhra Pradesh, India. It houses the Satish Dhawan Space Centre, one of the two satellite launch centres in India (the other being Thumba Equatorial Rocket Launching Station, Thiruvananthapuram). Indian Space Research Organisation (ISRO) launches satellites using multistage rockets such as the Polar Satellite Launch Vehicle and the Geosynchronous Satellite Launch Vehicle from Sriharikota. Sriharikota is selected by ISRO because of its proximity to the equator, it gives extra centripital force from the rotation of Earth.

Location

Sriharikota is partly located in Sullurpeta mandal and partly located in Tada mandal in Tirupati District in Andhra Pradesh and separates Pulicat Lake from the Bay of Bengal The nearest town and railway station is Sullurpeta which is 16 km west of Sriharikota and nearest city is Tirupati. A 16 km elevated road connects Sriharikota to the mainland.

Climate
The climate of Sriharikota is tropical wet and dry (Aw; bordering on As) in the Köppen–Geiger climate classification system. Sriharikota has hot summers and mild winters. Summers can reach up to 38 degrees Celsius, while winters can reach down to 20 degrees Celsius. Since Sriharikota is only 105 km north of Chennai, its climate is similar to that of Chennai.

References

External links 

 Sriharikota's Videos and Pictures
 About Sriharikota at Sharicons website

Towns in Tirupati district
Barrier islands
Space programme of India
Islands of Andhra Pradesh
Islands of the Bay of Bengal
Geography of Tirupati district
Islands of India